Northampton General Hospital is a district general hospital in Northampton, Northamptonshire, England. It is managed by the Northampton General Hospital NHS Trust.

History
The hospital was established in a townhouse on George Row in 1744. After a fund-raising campaign led by Dr William Kerr, a purpose-built hospital designed by Mr A Saxton was built at Northampton Fields and opened in 1793.
 
In October 2012, the Macmillan Haematology Unit, a multimillion-pound cancer facility, was opened by the Countess of Halifax, President of Macmillan Cancer Support.

Performance

 
In October 2013 as a result of the Keogh Review the Trust was put into the highest risk category by the Care Quality Commission.
 
On 27 March 2014 the Care Quality Commission published its report following an inspection of the trust. As well as identifying areas for improvement there were a number of positive findings.  The trust was judged as good across all services for ‘caring’ and inspectors found that, in the main, the safety and effectiveness of services had been maintained, despite the overriding urgent care pressures. On 24 October 2019 the Care Quality Commission published a report rating the hospital as "requires improvement" overall, with some areas "good".

In the news
Two series of BBC Three's Bizarre ER were filmed at the hospital in autumn 2009.

An elderly man died in March 2018 while waiting to be seen by a consultant at the hospital's accident and emergency department: overcrowding at the department was blamed.

Transport links 
Northampton has several bus stations outside, and it is served by the 9B 12 51 4 & 5 which are operated by Stagecoach Midlands. The VH1 is operated by the Cogenhoe parish council.

See also

Kettering General Hospital
 List of hospitals in England
 List of NHS trusts

References

NHS hospitals in England
Hospitals in Northampton
Hospitals established in the 1740s